Pooneryn Fort  (Punarin Balakotuwa) is located in Pooneryn, adjacent to the Jaffna Peninsula. It was built by the Portuguese to protect their possessions in Jaffna. The fort was captured by the Dutch in 1658, and subsequently by the British in 1796.

During Dutch possession, the square-shaped fort had two bastions. In 1805, British built a rest house at the fort. The fort was under the control of Sri Lankan Army and LTTE during the civil war but is now fully accessible to the public. The remains of the fort however are currently in a poor state of repair.

References 

 

1796 establishments in the British Empire
British forts in Sri Lanka
Dutch forts in Sri Lanka
Forts in Northern Province, Sri Lanka
Portuguese forts in Sri Lanka
Archaeological protected monuments in Kilinochchi District